Primera División de México Invierno 2001 (Mexico First Division Winter 2001) is the second part of a two tournament season in Association football in Mexico. It began on July 21, 2001, and ended on November 25, the end of the season. La Piedad was promoted to Primera División de México, making possible that 19 teams took part in the Mexican First Division instead of the 18 teams in previous seasons. Pachuca defeated UANL in the final, their second title win.

Overview

Final standings (groups)

League table

Results

Top goalscorers 
Players sorted first by goals scored, then by last name. Only regular season goals listed.

Source: MedioTiempo

Playoffs

Bracket

Quarterfinals

UANL won 4–1 on aggregate.

Toluca won 3–1 on aggregate.

2–2 on aggregate. Pachuca advanced for being the higher seeded team.

Cruz Azul won 4–2 on aggregate.

Semifinals

1–1 on aggregate. UANL advanced for being the higher seeded team.

Pachuca won 5–3 on aggregate.

Finals

Pachuca won 3–1 on aggregate.

External links
 Mediotiempo.com (where information was obtained)

Mexico
2001–02 in Mexican football
2001B